is a Japanese professional motorcycle road racer. He began his motorcycle racing career competing in the Japanese national championships before racing internationally in Grand Prix motorcycle racing, the Superbike World Championship as well as in the British Superbike Championship. Kagayama raced Suzuki motorcycles for the majority of his career.

Motorcycle racing career
Kagayama was born in Yokohama Japan. He began motorcycle racing in 1990, competing for many years in the All Japan Road Race Championship, finishing fourth in 2001. He also contested four 250 cc World Championship races in 1997 and 1998, finishing in the top 8 in all four races.

In 2003 he raced in the British Superbike Championship for Rizla Suzuki, alongside double British champion John Reynolds, and had won three races when he crashed heavily at Cadwell Park. He returned for the start of 2004, finishing 3rd in the championship despite not being at full fitness early in the season (a further crash caused a broken collarbone).

For  he joined  Superbike World Champion Troy Corser in the Belgian-based Alstare Suzuki team in the Superbike World Championship, and won races on the GSX-R1000, riding on largely unfamiliar circuits against some of the world's top riders. In the first race, he collided with Noriyuki Haga while battling for the lead on the final lap. He then had a run of poor results, before taking a third and a fourth at Misano, and then an impressive double win from the second row at Brno, nearly doubling his points total in one weekend. He came 7th overall in the series.

In 2006 he raced in the final round of the All Japan Road Race Championship at Suzuka as a wild card and won the race. In  he remained at Suzuki, but missed four rounds through injury. He finished the season ranked 13th. Also in 2007, Kagayama teamed up with Kousuke Akiyoshi to win the prestigious Suzuka 8 Hours endurance race for Suzuki. For 2008 he switched his racing number to #34, as used by former 500 cc World Champion Kevin Schwantz. Again he had an injury-hit season, and was easily the lowest-placed of the three works Suzuki riders in the standings.

In 2010 Kagayama returned to the British Superbike Championship riding for the Worx Suzuki team. His teammate was Tommy Hill. He finished 15th overall with one podium finish.

In 2011 Kagayama launched his own team "Team Kagayama" for a full season in the JSB (Japanese Superbike) class of the All Japan Road Race Championship. He is the owner and sole rider for the team, and the team's bike is the Suzuki GSX-R1000. Kagayama could not record a win this season and ended up 4th in the championship.

Kagayama and the team are in the 2012 championship as well and recorded a win in the 6th round at Sugo.  It was the first win for Kagayama since his full-season comeback to Japan in 2011 as well as for Team Kagayama since its launch the same year.

Career Rankings
1995: 11th, All Japan Road Race Championship Superbike Suzuki GSX-R750

1996: 11th, All Japan Road Race Championship GP250 Suzuki RGV250

1997: 3rd, All Japan Road Race Championship GP250 Suzuki RGV250

1998: 13th, All Japan Road Race Championship GP250 Suzuki RGV250

1999: 16th, All Japan Road Race Championship Superbike Suzuki GSX-R750

2000: 7th, All Japan Road Race Championship Superbike Suzuki GSX-R750

2001: 4th, All Japan Road Race Championship Superbike Suzuki GSX-R750

2002: Suzuki MotoGP Test Rider Suzuki GSV-R

2003: 7th, British Superbike Championship: Rizla Suzuki Crescent Suzuki GSX-R1000

2004: 3rd, British Superbike Championship: Rizla Suzuki Crescent Suzuki GSX-R1000

2005: 5th, Superbike World Championship:  Alstare Suzuki Corona Extra Suzuki GSX-R1000

2006: 7th, Superbike World Championship:  Alstare Suzuki Corona Extra Suzuki GSX-R1000

2007: 13th, Superbike World Championship:  Alstare Suzuki Corona Extra Suzuki GSX-R1000

2008: 11th, Superbike World Championship:  Team Suzuki Alstare Suzuki GSX-R1000

2009: 12th, Superbike World Championship:  Team Suzuki Alstare Suzuki GSX-R1000

2010: 15th, British Superbike Championship:  Worx Crescent Racing Suzuki GSX-R1000

2011: 4th, All Japan Road Race Championship JSB1000:  Team Kagayama Suzuki GSX-R1000

2012: 8th, All Japan Road Race Championship JSB1000:  Team Kagayama Suzuki GSX-R1000

2013: 10th, All Japan Road Race Championship JSB1000: Team Kagayama Suzuki GSX-R1000

2014: 5th, All Japan Road Race Championship JSB1000: Team Kagayama Suzuki GSX-R1000

2015- 12th, All Japan Road Race Championship JSB1000: Team Kagayama Suzuki GSX-R1000

2016- 8th, All Japan Road Race Championship JSB1000: Team Kagayama Suzuki GSX-R1000

2017- 10th, All Japan Road Race Championship JSB1000: Team Kagayama Suzuki GSX-R1000

2018- All Japan Road Race Championship JSB1000: Team Kagayama Suzuki GSX-R1000

Suzuka 8 Hours
2000 - 22nd (Team Suzuki / Atushi Watanabe / GSX-R750)
2001 - 3rd (Team Suzuki / Akira Ryo, Atsushi Watanabe / GSX-R750)
2002 - DNF (Team Suzuki / Akira Ryo / GSX-R750)
2003 - DNF (Yoshimura Suzuki / Atsushi Watanabe / GSX-R1000)
2004 - 2nd (Yoshimura Suzuki / Atsushi Watanabe / GSX-R1000)
2005 - 10th (Yoshimura Suzuki / Atsushi Watanabe / GSX-R1000)
2007 - 1st (Yoshimura Suzuki / Kousuke Akiyoshi / GSX-R1000)
2008 - 4th (Yoshimura Suzuki / Kousuke Akiyoshi / GSX-R1000)
2010 - 6th (Yoshimura Suzuki / Daisaku Sakai, Nobuatsu Aoki / GSX-R1000)
2011 - 2nd (Yoshimura Suzuki / Josh Waters, Nobuatsu Aoki / GSX-R1000)
2012 - 15th (S.E.R.T. / Vincent Philippe, Anthony Delhalle / GSX-R1000)
2013 - 3rd (Team KAGAYAMA / Kevin Schwantz, Noriyuki Haga / GSX-R1000)
2014 - 3rd (Team KAGAYAMA & Verity / Dominique Aegerter, Noriyuki Haga / GSX-R1000)
2015 - 3rd (Team KAGAYAMA / Ryuichi Kiyonari, Noriyuki Haga / GSX-R1000)
2016 - 6th (Team KAGAYAMA / Ryuichi Kiyonari, Naomichi Uramoto / GSX-R1000)
[Year] - [Result] ([Team] / [Teammate(s)] / [Bike])

References

External links

 team-kagayama.com Official website

Sportspeople from Yokohama
Japanese motorcycle racers
Suzuki MotoGP riders
British Superbike Championship riders
Superbike World Championship riders
500cc World Championship riders
250cc World Championship riders
1974 births
Living people
MotoGP World Championship riders